Shore Acres State Park is a state park  south of Coos Bay in the U.S. state of Oregon. It is one of three state parks along the Cape Arago Highway, which runs along the Pacific Ocean west of U.S. Route 101.

The park features  of formal gardens including a rose-testing plot and Japanese lily pond, as well as ocean views and beach access. In the cooler months, visitors can watch storms and migrating whales from the park's sandstone cliffs. Another seasonal attraction is the Shore Acres Holiday Lights, lasting from Thanksgiving to New Year's Eve, when the gardens are decorated with lights and illuminated sculptures.

Shore Acres was originally an estate owned by Louis J. Simpson, a Coos County timber baron and son of shipping magnate Asa Meade Simpson. After fire and financial losses devastated his estate holdings, Simpson sold the land to the State of Oregon for use as a park in 1942. The state, which acquired park additions from other owners between 1956 and 1980, began restoring the garden in 1970.

See also
 List of Oregon state parks

References

External links
 
 Shore Acres State Park - Oregon State Parks
 Friends of Shore Acres

1942 establishments in Oregon
Gardens in Oregon
Parks in Coos County, Oregon
State parks of Oregon